Cape May City School District is a community public school district serving students in pre-kindergarten through sixth grade from Cape May, New Jersey, United States, at Cape May City Elementary School.

As of the 2021–22 school year, the district, comprised of one school, had an enrollment of 169 students and 22.6 classroom teachers (on an FTE basis), for a student–teacher ratio of 7.5:1.

Usually, a majority of the students are children of dependents of people at United States Coast Guard Training Center Cape May, which financially and personnel-wise supports Cape May City Elementary. The district also serves students from Cape May Point, who attend as part of a sending/receiving relationship. This is because its school district, Cape May Point School District, is a non-operating district, meaning it does not operate any schools. In 2016, one student came from Cape May Point.

The district is classified by the New Jersey Department of Education as being in District Factor Group "CD", the sixth-highest of eight groupings. District Factor Groups organize districts statewide to allow comparison by common socioeconomic characteristics of the local districts. From lowest socioeconomic status to highest, the categories are A, B, CD, DE, FG, GH, I and J.

For seventh through twelfth grades, public school students attend the schools of the Lower Cape May Regional School District, which serves students from Cape May City, Cape May Point, Lower Township and West Cape May. Schools in the district (with 2021–22 enrollment data from the National Center for Education Statistics) are
Richard M. Teitelman Middle School with 439 students in grades 7-8 and
Lower Cape May Regional High School (LCMRHS) with 764 students in grades 9-12.

History

In 1958, Paul W. Schmitdtchen became the superintendent of the school. Schmitdtchen decided to create a new high school, and therefore he is considered the father of LCMRHS, which opened in 1961. Schmitdtchen retired in 1972.

In previous eras the student body was about 300 with some students coming from residents of the United States Coast Guard Training Center Cape May. Because property values increased in Cape May, fewer local families could afford housing, and the number of Cape May students declined. Prior to the September 11 attacks there were discussions about reducing employee levels and possibly merging Cape May Elementary and West Cape May Elementary School. After September 11 the Coast Guard presence increased and enrollment increased. The influx of families from the Coast Guard base meant that the school remained open. The Coast Guard officially adopted Cape May Elementary in 2012. Richard Degener of The Press of Atlantic City wrote "What has always been a symbiotic relationship has grown downright cozy".

In 2020 the district gave some land to the city government so the latter could establish a park.

In 2020 the Cape May and West Cape May School District began sharing a single superintendent. In Summer 2021 Zach Palumbo became the shared superintendent of both the Cape May City and West Cape May districts.

Operations
As of 2013, the taxpayers of Cape May spend under $1.5 million annually, while the Coast Guard spends about $700,000 annually to support the school.

In 2021 there were plans to establish a dedicated path for bicycles between the Coast Guard base and the school so children living on-base have a safer way to travel to school. By June the plans were suspended.

Student body
 the average student population was around 150. Most students in the district come from the Coast Guard base, with 60% coming from there in 2016. Palumbo stated, as paraphrased by Bill Barlow of Press of Atlantic City, "it is unlikely the school could remain open" without the Coast Guard students.

Circa 2013 the percentage of Coast Guard students hovered between 43% and 62%.  The percentage of students who come from Coast Guard families has been up to 65%. In 2013 there were 144 students, with 74 being from Coast Guard families. At one time only 25 of the students only came from non-Coast Guard families in Cape May.

In 2016, 25% of students were non-public housing residents who resided elsewhere on Cape May while 15% came from Cape May public housing. Two children were homeless and one lived in Cape May Point.

School and former schools
Cape May City Elementary School serves students in grades PreK-6. The school served 175 students as of the 2017-18 school year. Its capacity is 227.
Zachary Palombo, Superintendent

Cape May City Elementary School
The school historically had a playground designed for older children. Circa 2013 it spent $40,000 to build a playground designed for younger children. Since 25 volunteers from the Coast Guard built the playground, the school administration saved on labor costs and had a larger playground built. The playground is used by community groups. The school also has a pool, a library, and the Dellas little league field, also used by the community.

Cape May High School

The first Cape May High School, built in 1901, was designed by Seymour Davis and built for $35,000. In 1917 a new Cape May High School facility was built, with the 1901 building becoming an elementary school. Cape May High School educated students of all races. The former convention hall was used as a basketball arena, baccalaureate venue, an auditorium, and a graduation hall by Cape May High. Paul S. Ensminger, originally from Palmyra, Pennsylvania, served as principal of CMHS for a 24 year period.

Cape May High closed effective December 22, 1960, and LCMRHS opened in 1961. Circa 1970 the first Cape May High School building was demolished, and an Acme Markets location was constructed on the site. The second Cape May High School building in 1961 became the city hall, and it also serves as the police station.

Franklin Street School

In the past Cape May elementary schools were segregated on the basis of race, with black elementary school students attending Franklin Street School. It opened in September 1928 and was decommissioned after World War II. The Center for Community Arts, as of 2021, aims to renovate the building.

Administration
Core members of the district's administration are:
Zachary H. Palombo, Superintendent
John Thomas, Business Administrator and Board Secretary

Board of education
The district's board of education is comprised of nine members who set policy and oversee the fiscal and educational operation of the district through its administration. As a Type II school district, the board's trustees are elected directly by voters to serve three-year terms of office on a staggered basis, with three seats up for election each year held (since 2012) as part of the November general election. The board appoints a superintendent to oversee the district's day-to-day operations and a business administrator to supervise the business functions of the district.

The Coast Guard has staff who assist with Cape May Elementary graduation events.

Programs
The school holds reading events, a triathlon, a Thursday homework club, a boat building contest, and the end of the school year picnic, and the Starry the Bear Coast Guard journey program. The Coast Guard is involved in those programs. The Starry program features a cartoon bear who is shown going through Coast Guard training.

References

External links

Cape May City Elementary School

School Data for the Cape May City Elementary School, National Center for Education Statistics

Cape May, New Jersey
Cape May Point, New Jersey
Public elementary schools in New Jersey
New Jersey District Factor Group CD
School districts in Cape May County, New Jersey
Schools in Cape May County, New Jersey